World's Greatest Melodies is an album by The Nashville String Band. The band consisted of Chet Atkins and Homer and Jethro.

Track listing

Side one 
 "Battle Hymn of the Republic" (Julia Ward Howe; arranged by Chet Atkins and Kenneth Burns)
 "Steel Guitar Rag" (Leon McAuliffe, Cliffie Stone, Merle Travis)
 "Fascination" (Dick Manning, Fermo Dante Marchetti)
 "Third Man Theme" (Anton Karas)
 "Medley: I'm Thinking Tonight of My Blue Eyes/Wabash Cannonball/Hawaiian Wedding Song" (A.P. Carter/A.P. Carter/Al Hoffman, Charles E. King, Dick Manning)

Side two 
 "Lara's Theme" (Maurice Jarre, Paul Francis Webster)
 "La Paloma" (Sebastián de Yradier; arranged by Chet Atkins and Kenneth Burns)
 "St. Louis Blues" (W. C. Handy)
 "Beer Barrel Polka" (Jaromír Vejvoda, Lew Brown, Václav Zeman, Wladimir Timm)
 "Dixie" (Daniel Decatur Emmett; arranged by Chet Atkins and Kenneth Burns)

Personnel 
Chet Atkins - guitar
Henry "Homer" Haynes - guita
Kenneth "Jethro" Burns - mandolin
with:
Jerry Shook, Jimmy Capps, Pete Wade, Ray Edenton - guitar
Henry Strzelecki - upright bass
Jerry Byrd - steel guitar
Johnny Gimble - mandolin
Floyd Cramer - piano
Jimmy Isbell, Kenny Buttrey - drums
Farrell Morris - percussion
Byron Bach, Martha McCrory - cello
Albert Coleman, Jo Lennon Parker, Samuel Terranova, Sheldon Kurland, Steven Smith, Zina Schiff - violin
Gary Van Osdale, Marvin Chantry - viola
Billy Puett - woodwind
The Jordanaires - vocal accompaniment
Arranged by Bill McElhiney

The Nashville String Band albums
1972 albums
Albums produced by Chet Atkins
RCA Victor albums